Gennadius or Gennadios may refer to:

People
 Gennadius of Constantinople (died 471), Patriarch of Constantinople from 458 to 471
 Gennadius of Massilia (5th century) Roman historian, best known for his work De Viris Illustribus
 Gennadius (magister militum Africae), Byzantine general and first exarch of Africa
 Gennadius (7th century), Byzantine general and exarch of Africa
 Gennadius of Astorga (9th century), Bishop of Astorga in Spain
 Gennadius Scholarius (c.1400–c.1473), Patriarch of Constantinople from 1454 to 1464
 Georgios Gennadios (1784–1854), Greek man of letters and educationalist
 Joannes Gennadius (1844–1932), Greek diplomat and bibliophile, son of Georgios
 Gennadios (Zervos) (born 1937), Greek Orthodox bishop in Italy
 Gennadios Xenodochof (born 1988), Greek footballer

Other
 Gennadius Library, Athens, Greece, founded by Joannes and named for Giorgios
 Gennadius (moth), a genus of moth

See also
Gennady